Theodore Papaconstantinou was born on June 15 in 1948 in Thessaloniki, Greece. He was the third child and the youngest of his two siblings, Vasilis and Theano. Influenced by his mother Erato who had an exceptional voice and by his grandfather Theodore Varveris, a great musician in his time, he was drawn to music, exhibiting his musical inclination from an early age.

He became familiar with Byzantine music as a child and together with his brother Vasilis (first cantor) chanted at St. Demetrius church at Sikies from 1958 till 1960 and at Aghia Triada (Holy Trinity) church in Thessaloniki from 1961 on. The family’s dire financial situation which followed his father’s serious accident prevented him from commencing his musical studies early on in life.  He received his first music lessons from a young blind musician and friend at the School for the Blind in Thessaloniki. Theodore tutored him in his high school subjects in return for piano instruction and solfege.

In 1963, after having acquired his first musical knowledge of the Western European musical tradition, at the age of 15 he attended the “Thessaloniki Conservatory” (now called “State Conservatory of Thessaloniki”). Theodore Papaconstantinou studied under the following music teachers:
I. Sideris (Instrumentation)
Tasos Pappas (Music theory, Choir)
Fani Aidali (Monody)
Ch. Kalaitzis (Piano)
Solon Michailidis (Counterpoint, Music morphology)

	Since 1966, he began collaborating with Antonis Kontogeorgiou at the XMO Choir (Christian Student Group Children’s Choir of Thessaloniki) until he found his own choir, the “Aghia Triada (Holy Trinity) Children’s Choir” of Thessaloniki. The year 1967 proved to be exceptionally fruitful for Theodore Papaconstantinou as he received his degree in Harmony with the highest possible distinction and his degree in Vocal Studies with distinction. It was also the year that the “Aghia Triada (Holy Trinity) Children’s Choir” was founded, initially to replace the cantors at the 2nd Sunday Mass at Aghia Triada (Holy Trinity) church. Theodore Papaconstantinou taught the first choir members (only boys at the time).  His calling in composition led him to harmonize and arrange the liturgy of St. John the Chrysostome for a 4-voice choir (S.A.T.B.). This work proved to be his greatest. However, during that same year he composed and presented other significant musical works:

	* Άγιε μου Γιάννη Συριανέ / My Saint John Syriane - choral arrangement
 Αναστάσεως ημέρα/ Χριστός Ανέστη / Easter Day hymn Christ is Risen
 Εγκώμια της Μεγάλης Παρασκευής / Praises of Good Friday - Good Friday evening service arrangement for a 4-voice choir
 Είμ΄ένα μικρό παιδάκι / I'm a little kid - choral arrangement
 Η πηγή του χωριού μου / The source of my village - choral arrangement
 Θυμήσου όπου πας / Remember where you are going - harmonisation
 Κατασκηνωτικό / Camping - choral arrangement
 Κύριε Ελέησον / Lord, have mercy
 Τα πήρανε τα πρόβατα / They got the sheep - choral arrangement
 Το τραγούδι των παιδιών / Children's song
 Χριστός γεννάται, δοξάσατε / Christ is born, you glorified - Byzantine Christmas hymn

In 1968 he was called to do his military service. On October 23, 1969, during his first night transferred to Cyprus, he passed away due to brain aneurysm at the very young age of 21. After his sudden death, his brother Vasilis Papaconstantinou took over his choir. For the next 50 years, the Aghia Triada children’s choir has been chanting the 2nd Sunday Mass and performing a wide repertoire of choral music (both classical and contemporary) in Greece and Europe, being distinguished as one of the best Greek children’s choirs.

References 
From an interview with Vasilis Papaconstantinou
Η χορωδία Αγίας Τριάδας Θεσσαλονίκης μέσα από την ιστορία και το έργο της (1967-2017): μουσικολογικές προσεγγίσεις. Γρηγοριάδου, Ευδοξία. Διπλωματική εργασία Α.Π.Θ. Τμημα Μουσικών Σπουδών, Ιούνιος 2017.
http://sophia.mus.auth.gr/xmlui/handle/123456789/1691

Cypriot composers
Male composers
1949 births
1970 deaths
20th-century composers
20th-century male musicians